Romulus and the Sabines may refer to:
 Romulus and the Sabines (1961 film), an Italian adventure comedy film
 Romulus and the Sabines (1945 film), an Italian comedy film